HD 16028 is a star in the constellation Andromeda. Its apparent magnitude is 5.71. Located approximately  distant, it is an orange giant of spectral type K3III, a star that has used up its core hydrogen and has expanded.

Double star catalogues list two stars as optical companions. One has a magnitude of 10.9 and is separated by 16.9 arcseconds. It has been suggested it is related to the primary, but parallax measured by Gaia yields a much greater distance for this star in comparison to HD 16028. The other is even fainter and is separated 45 arcseconds from the primary.

References

Andromeda (constellation)
016028
K-type giants
0748
012072
Durchmusterung objects